Canoparmelia roseoreagens is a species of corticolous (bark-dwelling), foliose lichen in the family Parmeliaceae. Found in Brazil, it was formally described as a new species in 2009 by lichenologists Marcelo Marcelli, Luciana da Silva Canêz, and John Elix.

Description

This lichen has a grayish appearance and is sublaciniate, meaning it has irregularly branched  that are adnate (attached) and contiguous (touching), with truncate apices and a smooth to  margin. The upper surface is smooth and may have weak or absent , which are reticulate (net-like), more evident in the young parts and may form small cracks. There are no ,  or soredia. The isidia are concolorous with the thallus, cylindrical, and erect, ranging from simple to mostly , brown, and measuring 0.10–0.45 mm wide. The medulla is white and does not produce a purple pigment when treated with K. The lower surface is black to dark brown, slightly shiny, and rugose (wrinkled); the marginal zone is brown, shiny, and rugose (or sometimes ); the rhizines (root-like structures) are white, dark brown, or rarely black, simple to furcate (forked), 0.25–0.50 mm long, few to frequent, and almost evenly distributed. There are no apothecia (cup-like sexual reproductive structures) or pycnidia (small asexual reproductive structures).

Canoparmelia roseoreagens contains several major lichen products: methyl olivetolcarboxylate, methyl divarinolcarboxylate, and eight unknown depsides that are derivatives of norsekikaic acid, norhomosekikaic acid, and norhyperhomosekikaic acids. The species epithet roseoreagens refers to the C+ (rose) chemical spot test reaction observed on the medulla.

References

Parmeliaceae
Lichen species
Lichens described in 2009
Lichens of Brazil
Taxa named by John Alan Elix